PTC may refer to:

Education
 Parent-teacher conference
 Pilot Training College, a former organisation in Ireland and the US
 Police Training Centre, Bangladesh
 Portage Trail Conference, an association of public schools in Ohio, US
 Pacific Theological College, theological college in Fiji
 Presbyterian Theological College, Victoria, Australia
 RAF Personnel and Training Command, 1994–2007
 Pittsburgh Technical College, 2-year college in Pittsburgh, PA, US

Organizations
Pacific Telecommunications Council, a telecommunications industry trade association for the Pacific Rim
 PTC India, an Indian energy trading company
 PTC Punjabi, a television network in India
 PTC Punjabi (Canada)
 PTC Punjabi Film Awards
 Partido Trabalhista Cristão (Christian Labour Party), a political party in Brazil
 Pakistan Telecommunication Company Ltd, KSE code
 Pakistan Tobacco Company
 Partit del Treball de Catalunya (Party of Labour of Catalonia), a communist party in Catalonia, Spain
 Polska Telefonia Cyfrowa, formal name of T-Mobile Polska
 Public Services, Tax and Commerce Union, UK, 1996–1998
 Public Transport Commission, in New South Wales, Australia
 Public Transport Corporation, in Victoria, Australia
 Public Transport Council, in Singapore
 Radio Television of Serbia (Радио-телевизија Србије), a public broadcaster in Serbia

United States
 PTC (software company), formerly Parametric Technology Corp., Massachusetts, a software company
 PTC Therapeutics, a pharmaceutical company
 Parents Television Council, a U.S.-based advocacy group
 Pennsylvania Turnpike Commission
 Philadelphia Toboggan Coasters, roller coaster manufacturer, formerly Philadelphia Toboggan Company
 Philadelphia Transportation Company, 1940–1968
 Philmont Training Center, of the Boy Scouts of America 
 Pioneer Theatre Company, Utah
 A type of Patrol boat; se Patrol torpedo boat PT-41

Science and technology
 Papillary thyroid cancer, the most common type of thyroid cancer
 Passive thermal control, a slow roll of a spacecraft on its horizontal axis to stabilize the thermal response to solar heating
 Peptidyl transferase centre, associated with protoribosomes and the possible origin of ribosomes and abiogenesis
 Pseudotumor cerebri or idiopathic intracranial hypertension, a condition
 Percutaneous transhepatic cholangiography, X-ray technique for biliary tract
 Phase-transfer catalyst, that facilitates interphase migration
 Phenylthiocarbamide, an organosulfur thiourea
 Positive temperature coefficient, of materials which increase resistance with temperature
 PTC thermistor, a type of resistor
 Polymeric positive temperature coefficient (PPTC) device or resettable fuse
 Poly(trimethylene carbonate), a derivative of trimethylene carbonate
 Patched, a protein receptor

 Positive train control, a type of train protection system
 Potential tropical cyclone, a term used since 2017 in NHC advisory products to describe a disturbance that is not yet a tropical cyclone

Other uses
 Paid to click, payment for viewing advertisements
 Pakuwon Trade Center, a shopping center in Surabaya, Indonesia
 Pass-Through Certificates, evidence of ownership of multiple Equipment Trust Certificates
 Piece to camera, spoken directly to a film or TV camera
 Players Tour Championship, in snooker
 Premium Tax Credit, Affordable Care Act provision
Production tax credit, US, for renewable energy production
 Punggol MRT/LRT station (LRT station code)